Bernhard III, Margrave of Baden-Baden (7 October 1474 – 29 June 1536) inherited in 1515 part of his father's margraviate of Baden.  He ruled his part from 1515 until 1536.

His two brothers, Ernest and Philip inherited the other parts; after Philip died, he and Ernest each inherited half of Philip's part.
This created two lines of rulers:
 "Bernhardine line" (Catholic) ruled Baden-Baden
 "Ernestine line" (Protestant) ruled Baden-Durlach
The Bernhardine line died out in 1771, allowing Margrave Charles Frederick of the Ernestine line to reunite the Margraviate of Baden.

Bernard was brought up at the court of Emperor Maximilian I and went to Spain with his friend, Maximilian's son Philip I.  Philip was appointed King of Spain in 1504.

Margrave Bernhard tended in his later years to Protestantism and introduced the Reformation into the upper Margraviate.

Marriage and issue 
Bernhard III married in 1535, two years before his death, Franziska of Luxemburg, Countess of Brienne and Ligny (d. 17 June 1566), the daughter of Charles I, Count of Ligny.  They had two sons; the younger, Christopher, was born after Bernard's death:
 Philibert (born: 22 January 1536, died: 3 October 1569)
 Christopher (born: 26 February 1537; died: 2 August 1575)

Bernhard, however, had numerous extra-marital children, of whom six sons (Bernard, Philip, John, George, Caspar, and Melchior) are known.  In 1532, Emperor Charles V declared George, Caspar and Melchior to be legitimate princes, and later, Bernhard and Philip as well.  These sons were not entitled to inherit, but they received a maintenance payment after their father's death.

Ancestors

See also 
 Baden
 List of rulers of Baden

References and sources 
 
 Johann Christian Sachs: Einleitung in die Geschichte der Marggravschaft und des marggrävlichen altfürstlichen Hauses Baden, Karlsruhe 1764–1770, vol. 3, p. 195–214

Footnotes 

Margraves of Baden-Baden
1474 births
1536 deaths
15th-century German people
16th-century German people
House of Zähringen
Burials at Stiftskirche, Baden-Baden